Mathilde Gerner (born 14 September 1996), better known by her stage mononym Hoshi, is a French singer-songwriter.

Biography

Early life 

Mathilde Gerner was born on 14 September 1996 in Versailles and grew up in the commune Montigny-le-Bretonneux of the communauté d'agglomération Saint-Quentin-en-Yvelines. She started playing the piano at the age of 6 and the guitar at the age of 15, which is when she wrote her first songs.

Musical career 

Gerner began her musical career with the amateur music group TransyStory, which was formed in September 2011. She provided vocals, keyboard, and guitar to this four-person group. The band occasionally put up municipal performances in Montigny-le-Bretonneux. The group played "Lou", their first recorded piece of music. Around the same time, in December 2011, Gerner alone competed in and won the "Jeunes Talents, c’est maintenant!" competition, organized by the city. During this competition, she was noticed by Marc Isacco, who was in charge of a musical section in Montigny. Through Isacco, she was able to meet established artists and perform in larger venues. TransyStory separated at the end of 2012 and Gerner continued her solo career.

Being passionate about Japanese culture, she chose Hoshi Hideko as her stage name, later shortened to simply Hoshi (星), which means "star" in Japanese. She became known by publishing covers on the Internet and she received the support of the label Styiens. In 2013, at the age of 16, she was invited by the casting director of the French The Voice to compete. She successfully passed auditions but decided not to continue when the show's production wanted to control her song choice.

Gerner left high school and devoted herself to music by performing in the streets. In 2014, she participated in the show Rising Star on the channel M6, but her cover of "Mistral gagnant" did not qualify her. She returned to singing in the streets, where she was able to try out compositions. She also performed solo for small concerts. She was contacted almost two years later by a manager, through whom she was signed by the label Jo & Co.

Gaining recognition 

On 3 March 2017, she released her first single, "Comment je vais faire". The song and its music video achieved some success.

On 19 May 2017, she released her first EP, "Comment je vais faire", through the label Jo & Co. It contained the eponymous track along with an acoustic version, as well as three original tracks, entitled "Manège à trois", "En gros tout est gris", and "Parking sonne".

On 23 March 2018, she released her first album, "". Her breakthrough success came with the title "Ta marinière".

On 5 October 2018, she sang a duet in Ycare's song "À qui la faute".

In 2020, she was nominated in the Victoires de la musique in the category "Stage Révélation of the Year".

Personal life 

Gerner appeared with Gia Martinelli in November 2018 on the red carpet at the NRJ Music Awards when she was nominated for the category of Francophone Breakthrough of the Year (Révélation francophone de l'année). In December the same year, she said she was the victim of a "forced coming out" due to the publication of an article in Paris Match that wrote about her homosexuality based on comments she denies ever making.

Suffering from hearing loss since childhood, she learns during her first tour that she suffers from Meniere's disease. She mentions it in an interview in February 2020  then speaks about it publicly in April 2021 on the set of the program C à vous .

Influences 
Gerner's varied influences include Jacques Brel, Serge Gainsbourg, Catherine Ringer, Les Rita Mitsouko, Noir Désir, Léo Férré, The Cranberries, Patti Smith, Janis Joplin, Izïa Higelin, and Nirvana.

Discography

Albums

Singles

External links 
 Hoshi artist page on the Jo & Co label's website

References 

1996 births
Living people
French women singer-songwriters
21st-century French singers
21st-century French women singers
French LGBT singers
Lesbian singers
People from Versailles